MCCA may refer to:
Marketing Communication Consultant Association
Massachusetts Convention Center Authority
MCC Academy